Marin Vasile-Goldberger was a male Romanian international table tennis player.

He won a silver medal at the 1936 World Table Tennis Championships on the men's team event.

He famously played in a match against Michel Haguenauer that lasted 7 hours 35 minutes before the match was stopped.

See also
 List of table tennis players
 List of World Table Tennis Championships medalists

References

Romanian male table tennis players
World Table Tennis Championships medalists